Pathways to Unknown Worlds is an album by jazz composer, bandleader and keyboardist Sun Ra and his Arkestra recorded in Chicago in 1973 and originally released on his Saturn label and rereleased by the ABC/Impulse! label in 1975. In 2000, Evidence Music released Pathways to Unknown Worlds + Friendly Love, added an untitled track from the same sessions as well as the previously unreleased Friendly Love album.

Reception
The Allmusic review by Lindsay Planer stated: "the three free jazz instrumental improvisations are in many respects quite similar to the laissez-faire sonic free for alls that had become synonymous with Ra's concurrent Arkestra(s)".

Track listing
All compositions by Sun Ra

Side One: 
 "Pathways to Unknown Worlds" - 12:12
Side Two: 
 "Extension Out" - 7:31
 "Cosmo-Media" - 6:58

Personnel
Sun Ra - keyboards 
Akh Tal Ebah, Lamont McClamb - trumpet 
Marshall Allen - alto saxophone, flute, oboe
Danny Davis - alto saxophone
John Gilmore - tenor saxophone, percussion
Danny Ray Thompson - baritone saxophone
Eloe Omoe - bass clarinet
Ronnie Boykins, Bill Davis - bass
Clifford Jarvis - drums 
Russell Branch - percussion
Eugene Brennan - congas
Stanley Morgan - percussion, congas

References 

Sun Ra albums
Impulse! Records albums
El Saturn Records albums
1975 albums